Filo is a very thin unleavened dough used for making pastries.

Filo, Fillo or Fillos may also refer to:

 Filó (born 1972), Portuguese footballer
 Filo (name)
 Domenick Filopei, American musical artist; see Filo & Peri
 El Filo, a town in Mexico

See also
 
 
 Philo (disambiguation)
 LIFO (disambiguation)